Datuk Raime Unggi (born 8 March 1970) is a Malaysian politician who has served as Nominated Member of the Sabah State Legislative Assembly (MLA) since October 2020. He served as Member of Parliament (MP) for Tenom from March 2004 to May 2018. He is a member of the United Malays National Organisation (UMNO), a component party of the ruling Barisan Nasional (BN) coalition which is aligned with the ruling Perikatan Nasional (PN). 

He was elected to the Dewan Rakyat, Parliament in the 2004 general election. Little known at the time, he replaced Parliamentary Secretary Rizalman Abdullah for the BN nomination for Tenom seat  and went on to win the general election for the seat. On 8 October 2020, he was appointed to the Sabah State Legislative Assembly by Chief Minister Hajiji Noor as a Nominated Member.

Election results

Honours 
  :
  Commander of the Order of Kinabalu (PGDK) - Datuk (2009)

References 

Living people
1970 births
People from Sabah
Murut people
Members of the Dewan Rakyat
United Malays National Organisation politicians
Malaysian Muslims
Commanders of the Order of Kinabalu